Jennifer Louise Worth RN RM (25 September 1935 – 31 May 2011) was a British memoirist. She wrote a best-selling trilogy about her work as a nurse and midwife practising in the poverty-stricken East End of London in the 1950s: Call the Midwife, Shadows of the Workhouse and Farewell to The East End. A television series, Call the Midwife, based on her books, began broadcasting on BBC One on 15 January 2012. After leaving nursing, she re-trained as a musician.

Biography
Jennifer Louise Lee was born in Clacton-on-Sea, Essex, on 25 September 1935, to Gordon and Elsie (née Gibbs) Lee. Worth was raised in Amersham, Buckinghamshire. She had a younger sister, Christine, and two younger paternal half-sisters. After leaving school at the age of 15 she learned shorthand and typing and became the secretary to the head of Dr Challoner's Grammar School. She then trained as a nurse at the Royal Berkshire Hospital, Reading, and moved to London to receive training to become a midwife.

"Jenny" Lee was hired as a staff nurse at the London Hospital in Whitechapel in the 1950s. With the Sisters of St John the Divine, an Anglican community of nuns, she worked to aid the poor. She was then a ward sister at the Elizabeth Garrett Anderson Hospital in Bloomsbury. She left midwifery to work in palliative care at the Marie Curie Hospice in Hampstead.

She married the artist Philip Worth in 1963, and they had two daughters. Worth left nursing in 1973 to pursue her musical interests. In 1974, she was appointed a licentiate of the London College of Music, where she taught piano and singing. She obtained a fellowship in 1984. She performed as a soloist and with choirs throughout the UK and Europe.

Besides her career in nursing and her writing, 
Worth taught piano in the front room of her big family home, known as the White House on the St. John’s Road in Boxmoor, Hemel Hempstead. She held regular concerts for all her piano pupils as a target to work towards, where pupils would perform to a crowd of other pupils and their parents. An excruciating experience for some of the children performing, but giving rhythm and targets in her teaching of music. She also supported her pupils through the musical grades. She drank tea ferociously through each piano lesson and could always be heard singing her way from the kitchen to the grand front parlour with her tray of teapots and cups. A small dark rosewood Blüthner of Leipzig, grand piano was used by herself, her daughters and her pupils. Her piano lessons were classical and gave her pupils sound musical theory. To her pupils she seemed very classical and somewhat formal, but she was a deeply talented woman who imparted a love for singing and music.

Jenny Worth was also a keen and accomplished gardener, with green fingers, tending to the White House's sumptuous grounds and to a vegetable allotment in Chaulden Allotments 400m from her home.

Many years later she began writing, and her first volume of memoirs, Call the Midwife, was published in 2002. The book became a best-seller when it was reissued in 2007. Shadows of the Workhouse (2005; reissued 2008) and Farewell to the East End (2009) also became best-sellers. The trilogy sold almost a million copies in the UK alone. In a fourth volume of memoirs, In the Midst of Life, published in 2010, Worth reflects on her later experiences caring for the terminally ill.

Activism
Worth was highly critical of Mike Leigh's 2004 film Vera Drake, for depicting the consequences of illegal abortions unrealistically. She argued that the method shown in the movie, far from being fairly quick and painless, was in fact almost invariably fatal for the woman. As a result of the harm done with such illegal procedures, she approved of the legalization of abortion in the UK, saying this was a medical, not moral, issue.

Death
Worth died on 31 May 2011, having been diagnosed with cancer of the oesophagus earlier in the year. Deeply religious, she had a commitment to God. The first episode of the television series Call the Midwife, based on her experiences in Poplar, London, in the late 1950s, was dedicated to her.

Publications
  
 Call the Midwife (First book in the Midwife trilogy)  (2002)
 Shadows of the Workhouse (Second book in the Midwife trilogy)  (2005)
  (Third book in the Midwife trilogy)

References

1935 births
2011 deaths
People from Clacton-on-Sea
English memoirists
English midwives
Nurses from London
English classical pianists
English women pianists
English Anglicans
Deaths from cancer in England
Deaths from esophageal cancer
20th-century English writers
21st-century English writers
20th-century English women writers
21st-century English women writers
British women memoirists
20th-century classical pianists
20th-century English singers
20th-century English women singers
20th-century women pianists